The Campbell Playhouse (also known as Campbell Soundstage, TV Soundstage, and Campbell Summer Soundstage, (summer hiatus only, see below)) was an American anthology series and television drama that originally aired on NBC from June 6, 1952 to May 28, 1954. 

The series was sponsored by the Campbell Soup Company.

History

Radio series

The television series was based on the 1938–40 radio series of the same name. The radio version was originally aired on CBS as The Mercury Theatre on the Air beginning July 11, 1938. The series made its last broadcast under that title on December 4, 1938. After that, the Campbell Soup Company sponsored the radio drama and renamed it The Campbell Playhouse. The Campbell Playhouse made its radio debut on December 9, 1938.

Orson Welles served as the host of the program.

The series offered 60-minute adaptations of famous novels and plays and, on certain occasions, adaptations of popular motion pictures of the time.

The radio program ended on March 31, 1940.

Television series

The Campbell's Soup Corporation decided to renew the radio series but this time on television. On June 6, 1952, The Campbell Playhouse aired on NBC.

The series originally aired as a one time summer replacement for the NBC sitcom The Aldrich Family. The next year on July 10, 1953, the series came back for its second season as a permanent summer replacement series, (The Aldrich Family went off the air on May 28, 1953), and also premiered on the fall lineup. The series also aired under the new name Campbell Soundstage. 

The series ended its run on May 28, 1954.

Campbell Summer Soundstage

On June 4, 1954, the series aired a summer hiatus series entitled Campbell Summer Soundstage.

It was a short-lived revival of the television series. The series aired reruns of anthology series such as ABC's Gruen Playhouse, (later known as Gruen Guild Theatre), DuMont's Dramatic Shorts, and NBC's Ford Theatre.

Production notes

The series was originally filmed live until its second season when it was released on film.

Directors

Garry Simpson
Alex Segal
Don Appell
Marc Daniels
Richard Irving
Don Medford

Producers

Martin Horrell (also served as executive producer)
Marc Daniels (also served as associate producer)

Episodes

Season 1 (1952)

Season 2 (1953–54)

Broadcast history

The Campbell Playhouse aired on Fridays at 9:30–10:00 pm for its entire run. Campbell Summer Soundstage aired at that time as well.

References

External links

1950s American anthology television series
1952 American television series debuts
1954 American television series endings
American live television series
Black-and-white American television shows
Campbell Soup Company
English-language television shows
NBC original programming